The 1927–28 Football League season was Birmingham Football Club's 32nd in the Football League and their 15th in the First Division. They finished in 11th position in the 22-team division. They also competed in the 1927–28 FA Cup, entering at the third round proper and losing to Manchester United in the fifth. Bill Harvey stood down as manager at the end of the season.

Twenty-seven players made at least one appearance in nationally organised competition, and there were eleven different goalscorers. Half-back Alec Leslie was ever-present over the 45-match season, and Joe Bradford was leading scorer for the seventh successive year, with 32 goals, of which 29 came in the league.

This season saw the last appearance by Frank Womack. He made his Birmingham debut in 1908, and went on to set club appearance records of 491 league games, a record which  still stands, and 515 games in senior competition, since overtaken by Gil Merrick. He never scored a senior goal.

Football League First Division

League table (part)

FA Cup

Appearances and goals

Players with name struck through and marked  left the club during the playing season.

See also
Birmingham City F.C. seasons

References
General
 Matthews, Tony (1995). Birmingham City: A Complete Record. Breedon Books (Derby). .
 Matthews, Tony (2010). Birmingham City: The Complete Record. DB Publishing (Derby). .
 Source for match dates and results: "Birmingham City 1927–1928: Results". Statto Organisation. Retrieved 12 May 2012.
 Source for lineups, appearances, goalscorers and attendances: Matthews (2010), Complete Record, pp. 296–97.
 Source for kit: "Birmingham City". Historical Football Kits. Retrieved 22 May 2018.

Specific

Birmingham City F.C. seasons
Birmingham